Ilie Oană Stadium (Romanian: Stadionul Ilie Oană) is a football stadium in Ploiești, Romania. It has been the home ground of Petrolul Ploiești since its inauguration in September 2011, and has a capacity of 15,073 spectators. The stadium was built on the site of the former arena, which was completed in 1937 and demolished in 2010.

Being ranked as a UEFA Category 4 stadium, Ilie Oană can host Europa League semi-finals and Champions League group stage matches. The stadium is named after Ilie Oană, a legendary player and coach of Petrolul Ploiești.

Notable events
The first match to be played at the stadium was an exhibition game in September 2011, between a team of former Petrolul Ploiești footballers which won the Cupa României in 1995 and a selection of former Romanian internationals, among which Gheorghe Hagi, Gheorghe Popescu, Viorel Moldovan, Ovidiu Stângă and Daniel Prodan. The former internationals won the match 4–3 and the first goal scored on this stadium belonged to Cristian Zmoleanu.

On 25 September 2011, Petrolul Ploiești played its first competitive match at the stadium, a Liga I fixture against Dinamo București. Cosmin Moți scored the first goal of the game and thus the first official goal at new Ilie Oană Stadium. Petrolul played its first European game on the stadium on 13 July 2013, a 3–0 defeat of Víkingur counting for the UEFA Europa League qualifiers.

The Romania national team played its first official match at the Ilie Oană on 29 March 2015, a 1–0 win over the Faroe Islands in the UEFA Euro 2016 qualifiers. Due to its proximity to the capital Bucharest, the stadium has continued to host Romania senior matches in recent years.

Transport connections

Tramway
800 metres from Ilie Oană there is a Ploiești tramway station named "Muzeul de Istorie" (line 101). It links the stadium with the north of the city and Ploiești-South Railstation.

Bus
The TCE bus lines with a stop close to Ilie Oană are:
5 - Vlahuță
5 - Tăbăcărie
28, 104, 106, 302, 305 - Maternitate

Airport

Events

Association football

Association football

Gallery

References

External links
Fotbal Club Petrolul Ploiești Official website
Stadionul Ilie Oană at World Stadiums

 

Football venues in Romania
Sport in Ploiești
FC Petrolul Ploiești